Patrick Villiers Farrow (November 27, 1942 – June 15, 2009) was an American sculptor and a peace and environmental activist.

Early life
Farrow was the son of actress Maureen O'Sullivan and writer-director-producer John Villiers Farrow. He had one older brother, Michael, and five younger siblings, including actresses Mia and Tisa, John, Prudence, and Stephanie. He grew up in Beverly Hills and went abroad to Spain and England.

His early jobs included acting in Hollywood in both TV and movies, serving as a Merchant Marine in the Pacific and working as an artist for WPAT radio station in New York City. He moved to Vermont in 1964. In 1966, he married Susan Hartwell Erb.

Career
A self-taught artist, Farrow had his first solo art show in 1967 at a Beverly Hills gallery. In 1990 he was elected a Fellow in the National Sculpture Society in New York City. In 1993, he bought an historic church in Castleton, Vermont, turning it into a home, studio and gallery.

His public sculpture Frisbee is located on the Middlebury College campus center green. In 1984, Farrow raised $20,000 to pay for the installation of another, "The Leash," in nearby Rutland.

Death
On June 15, 2009, Farrow was found in his home, dead from a gunshot wound. The cause of death was determined to be suicide.

References

1942 births
2009 suicides
American environmentalists
20th-century American sculptors
20th-century American male artists
American male sculptors
Artists from Los Angeles
Suicides by firearm in Vermont
Activists from Los Angeles
American people of Australian descent
American people of Irish descent
Sculptors who committed suicide